E. Denise Simmons (born October 2, 1951) is the former mayor of Cambridge, Massachusetts, having served her first mayoral term 2008–2009 term and her second mayoral term 2016-2017. She was the first openly lesbian African-American mayor in the United States. Simmons has been on the Cambridge City Council continuously from 2001 to present, serving ten consecutive terms.

Early life and education
Simmons was born on October 2, 1951. She grew up in Cambridge's Area 4 neighborhood and attended Cambridge schools. She received a Bachelor of Science degree in Sociology from the University of Massachusetts Boston, and a Master's degree in Psychotherapy from Antioch College.

In 1982, Simmons established her own business, the Cambridgeport Insurance Agency.

Public Service and Political Career

Public Service 
Simmons served as Executive Director of the Cambridge Civic Unity Committee in the 1980s. Among the work performed while in this role was her successful fight to increase the diversity within the Cambridge public school faculty.

In 1992, Simmons ran for and won a spot on the Cambridge School Committee. She quickly won praise from across Cambridge for her tremendous work ethic, and for her efforts to find ways to build consensus with her colleagues. Over the next several years, Simmons gained a reputation as a calm, thoughtful voice on the school committee, and as a person who always kept her door open to anyone who wished to speak with her.

Simmons is a Justice of the Peace and Notary Public.

City Council Member - 2001 to present 
In 2001, Simmons ran for and won a seat on the Cambridge City Council. She immediately set out to make local government more accessible to a wider range of people, and through efforts such as holding "town hall" style meetings, Simmons worked to get more people involved in their own governance.  Simmons – being Black, a woman, and a member of the GLBT community – worked hard to make sure that each of these constituencies was given a voice inside City Hall. Simmons was a member of the City Council when Cambridge City Hall became the first municipality, in 2004, to issue same-sex marriage licenses. She also promoted efforts to help local minority business owners network and establish themselves in Cambridge. Simmons also helped initiate community conversations about the role of race and class in contemporary Cambridge society.

First Term As Mayor 
Her election to mayor of Cambridge by the Cambridge City Council on January 14, 2008, was unanimous. The previous mayor of Cambridge, Kenneth Reeves, was the first openly gay African-American mayor in the United States. As Cambridge mayor, Simmons served as head of the city's legislative body—while the non-elected city manager serves as the city's chief executive officer. Simmons brought the same sensibilities to the mayor's office that she brought to her previous endeavors – notably, she took pains to create an open-door atmosphere to her constituents. She opened the "mayor's parlor" to the people of Cambridge, where she convened meetings on everything from environmental policy, to the coordination of the city's various social services providers, to a senior citizens' advisory group. Simmons developed a reputation as a workhorse, with an emphasis on constituent services.

Simmons was mayor during the summer of 2009, during which time Cambridge was thrust into the international spotlight due to the arrest of Harvard University Professor Henry Louis Gates, Jr.  As a result of the attention this incident generated, Simmons was sought after as a spokesperson for the city, and she was careful to avoid inflaming an already volatile situation.  Simmons was interviewed on ABC's Good Morning America, CBS's The Early Show, CNN's State Of The Union with John King, among several other national media outlets.  Simmons won praise from her constituents for giving measured, thoughtful responses in public, as well as for her diligent work to contain the situation behind the scenes. Simmons noted that she had a lengthy record of leading public discussions on how race and class impact contemporary Cambridge, and this work would continue long after the Professor Gates arrest faded from the headlines.

State Senate Bid 
In February 2010, Councillor Simmons announced that she was running for an open state Senate seat in the Middlesex, Suffolk and Essex district that was vacated by Anthony Galluccio.  She came in third, behind Everett City Councilor Sal DiDomenico and Cambridge Attorney Tim Flaherty, in the April 13, 2010 primary.  She released a statement to the press that said, in part: "Despite coming up a little short at the end, this campaign was still a winning experience for me. I have had a tremendous opportunity to get to meet so many people, to learn more about the issues impacting the people in this district, and to make many new friends in Cambridge and beyond. The volunteers that made phone calls and knocked on doors every day were phenomenal, and their dedication and enthusiasm for civic engagement energized me every day."  Having lost the primary, Councillor Simmons returned her attention to her duties on the Cambridge City Council.

Career 2012 - Present 
In the 2012–2013 term, she served as Vice Mayor of Cambridge.

Simmons was again elected Mayor on January 4, 2016.

On November 5, 2019, Simmons was elected to her 10th term on the Cambridge City Council

Personal 
Simmons is also a photo archivist and family historian and has facilitated workshops for public and private organizations both nationally and locally—including for the Cambridge Public Schools. Simmons has received numerous awards and commendations for her work in the community.

See also
List of first African-American mayors
List of the first LGBT holders of political offices
List of mayors of Cambridge, Massachusetts
 Cambridge, Massachusetts municipal election, 2013

References

External links
Office of the Mayor – City of Cambridge official website

|-

Living people
African-American mayors in Massachusetts
Antioch College alumni
Lesbian politicians
LGBT African Americans
LGBT mayors of places in the United States
LGBT people from Massachusetts
Cambridge, Massachusetts City Council members
Mayors of Cambridge, Massachusetts
Women mayors of places in Massachusetts
African-American city council members in Massachusetts
1951 births
21st-century African-American people
21st-century African-American women
20th-century African-American people
21st-century LGBT people
20th-century African-American women
African-American women mayors